Rosemary S. J. Schraer (October 1, 1924 – April 10, 1992) was the fifth chancellor of the University of California, Riverside from 1987 to 1992.  Schraer and UC Santa Barbara Chancellor Barbara Uehling were the first female chancellors in the history of the University of California.

Personal
Schraer was born near Utica in upstate New York. She was married to Harald Schraer in 1952, and had a son, David.

Schraer died on April 10, 1992, after having suffered a stroke on April 8.

Schraer Endowed Memorial Scholarship
History and purpose:

Rosemary S. J. Schraer, the seventh chancellor of UCR, was the first female chancellor of a University of California campus. Schraer was described as an optimist and a champion of the underprivileged. Her research activities included the biochemical aspects of cell structure and cell function. She also collaborated on scientific endeavors with her husband, Harald Schraer, with whom she co-authored many scientific studies. Schraer served in numerous professional organizations, including the American Chemical Society and the American Association of University Professors. Parallel to her professional involvement, she was active in an impressive variety of community service organizations, including the United Way Campaign of the Inland Valleys, Riverside Community Hospital governing board, American Association of University Women, and the Presley Institute of Corrections, Research, and Training. Before coming to UCR in 1985 as executive vice chancellor, she served at Pennsylvania State University, where she held numerous academic offices, including associate provost. In December 1992, after Schraer's sudden death, the Rosemary S. J. Schraer Endowed Memorial Scholarship was created with gifts from various donors and Dr. Harald Schraer. The scholarship provides support to undergraduates who combine outstanding leadership with exceptional academic achievement and service to the campus community. Dr. Harald Schraer, who resides in Pennsylvania, continues to support this fund and its goals.

Career at UC Riverside
Schraer was appointed executive vice chancellor under Chancellor Theodore L. Hullar in 1985. In 1987, Hullar was reassigned to UC Davis and Schraer was appointed  as the first female chancellor in the history of the UC system.

During her tenure, Schraer promoted the university as an outstanding research institution and increased external giving from $3 million to over $12 million annually. She also oversaw development of a campus growth master plan that allowed the campus to expand to accommodate 18,000 students.

Schraer announced her intent to retire at the end of the 1991-92 academic year, but she died on April 10, 1992. She was the second UCR chancellor to die while in office, the other being Tomás Rivera, who died in 1984.

She was succeeded by Raymond L. Orbach.

Education
Schraer earned her degree in chemistry from Syracuse University in 1946, then earned a Ph.D. in biochemistry from Syracuse University in 1953. While at Syracuse, she organized the first graduate student association in the Biochemistry Department and was its first president. She was also elected president of the graduate association.

Career
Albert Einstein Medical Center, Philadelphia
 Research associate (1953–1959)
Pennsylvania State University
 Visiting lecturer, Dept. of Biophysics, 1959–1961
 Assistant professor, Dept. of Biophysics, 1961–1975
 Assistant dean of research, College of Sciences, 1972–1973
 Acting head, Dept. of Computer Sciences, 1973–1974
 Associate dean of research, College of Sciences, 1973–1978
 Assistant professor, Dept. of Biochemistry, 1975–1985
 Assistant provost for the university, 1978–1981

References

External links
 Reference regarding UCR dates
 Biography

1924 births
1992 deaths
University of California, Riverside alumni
Chancellors of the University of California, Riverside
20th-century American academics